The San Luis Bridge, also known as State Bridge or Bridge over Culebra Creek, is a historic open spandrel arch bridge that crosses Culebra Creek in San Luis, Colorado. It was built in 1911 as a road bridge, but now serves pedestrian traffic. It is listed on the National Register of Historic Places.

History 
In 1909, the Colorado Legislature appropriated $2,000 for a highway bridge over Culebra Creek near San Luis. The bridge was designed by the State Engineer, and the work was advertised in the Rocky Mountain News. Bids were received on August 20, 1910, from Missouri Valley Bridge and Iron Company, Midland Bridge Company, Cuno Engineering and Construction Company, and M.F. Levy Construction Company. M.F. Levy bid lowest at $4700 and was awarded the contract. The difference was funded by an appropriation from the Board of County Commissioners of Costilla County.

Because of high water in the creek, abutment excavation was delayed until February 22, 1911. Construction was finished in May 1911; Costilla county paid $2,860.35. The bridge originally carried State Highway 15, but by the 1980s it carried a county road.

The bridge was listed on the National Register of Historic Places on February 4, 1985.

In 2007, the State Historical Fund granted $150,300 to the county to restore the bridge for pedestrian and bicycle use.

Design and significance 
The bridge has a single,  span made of reinforced concrete. It has an open spandrel arch design, a style uncommonly used in the Rocky Mountains. The San Luis Bridge is significant as one of the few State Bridges extant in Colorado, and one of the oldest and least modified open arch bridges in the state. The bridge deck is a  concrete slab, supported on the arch by six concrete columns. The guardrails are made of steel pipe.

See also 
National Register of Historic Places listings in Costilla County, Colorado
List of bridges on the National Register of Historic Places in Colorado
List of Colorado Department of Highways bridges on the National Register of Historic Places

References 

Road bridges on the National Register of Historic Places in Colorado
Bridges completed in 1911
Former road bridges in the United States
Pedestrian bridges in Colorado
National Register of Historic Places in Costilla County, Colorado
Concrete bridges in the United States
Open-spandrel deck arch bridges in the United States
Buildings and structures in Costilla County, Colorado